Giovanni Castiglione may refer to:

Giovanni Castiglione (cardinal) (1420–1460), Italian bishop and cardinal
Giovanni Castiglione (bishop) (died 1456), Italian bishop
Giovanni Battista Castiglione (1516–1598), Italian tutor to Princess (later Queen) Elizabeth I
Giovanni Benedetto Castiglione (1609–1664), Italian painter and printmaker